2015–16 Serie A1 is the 71st season of the Italian Championship (Italian Volleyball League) organized under the supervision of Federazione Italiana Pallavolo.

Squads

Regular season

|}

Play–offs

Quarterfinals
(Best-of-five playoff)

|}

|}

|}

|}

Semifinals
(Best-of-five playoff)

|}

|}

Finals
(Best-of-five playoff)

|}

Final standing

External links
Official website

Men's volleyball competitions in Italy
2015 in Italian sport
2016 in Italian sport
Italy